An icosahedral twin is a nanostructure appearing for atomic clusters and also nanoparticles with some thousands of atoms. These clusters are twenty-faced, made of twenty interlinked tetrahedra crystals, typically joined along triangular (e.g. cubic-(111)) faces having three-fold symmetry. One can think of their formation as a kind of atom-scale self-assembly. A related, more common structure has five units similarly arranged with twinning, which were known as "fivelings" in the 19th century, more recently as "decahedral multiply twinned particles", "pentagonal particles" or "star particles".   A variety of different methods (e.g. condensing argon, metal atoms, and virus capsids) lead to icosahedral form at size scales where surface energies are more important those from the bulk.

Causes 
When interatom bonding does not have strong directional preferences, it is not unusual for atoms to gravitate toward a kissing number of 12 nearest neighbors. The three most symmetric ways to do this are by icosahedral clustering, or by crystalline face-centered-cubic (cuboctahedral) and/or hexagonal (tri-orthobicupolar) close packing.

Icosahedral arrangements, typically because of their smaller surface energy, may be preferred for small clusters. However, the Achilles' heel for icosahedral clustering  is that it cannot fill space over large distances in a way that is translationally ordered, so there is some distortion of the atomic positions, that is elastic strain which DeWit pointed out can be thought of in terms of disclinations, an approach later extended to 3D by Yoffe. The shape is also not always that of a simple icosahedron, and there are now several software codes that make it easy to calculate these, for instance references.

At larger sizes the energy to distort becomes larger than the gain in surface energy, and bulk materials (i.e. sufficiently large clusters) generally revert to one of the crystalline close-packing configurations instead. In other words, when icosahedral clusters get sufficiently large, the bulk-atom vote wins out over the surface-atom vote, and the nanoparticles can reduce their energy by converting to a simple single crystal with a Wulff construction shape. This occurs typically in the range where the particles are 10-30 nanometers in diameter, but it does not always happen and the particles can grow to millimeter sizes.

Ubiquity 

Icosahedral twinning has been seen in face-centered-cubic metal nanoparticles that have nucleated: (i) by evaporation onto surfaces, (ii) out of solution, and (iii) by reduction in a polymer matrix.

Quasicrystals are un-twinned structures with long range rotational but not translational periodicity, that some initially tried to explain away as icosahedral twinning. Quasi-crystals let non-space-filling coordination persist to larger size scales. However, they generally form only when the compositional makeup (e.g. of two dissimilar metals like Ti and Mn) serves as an antagonist to formation of one of the more common close-packed space-filling but twinned crystalline forms.

See also 

Crystal twinning
Icosahedron
Nanomaterial based catalyst
Nanotechnology
Quasicrystals
Self-assembly of nanoparticles

Footnotes 

Nanoparticles